Maksym Valentynovych Zaremskyi (born 26 September 1991) is a Ukrainian trainer and politician currently serving as a People's Deputy of Ukraine from Ukraine's 202nd electoral district. He is a member of Servant of the People.

Early life and career 
Zaremskyi was born on 26 September 1991 in Mogilev, Belarus. He is the founder of the MaksymuS gym company, as well as the annual Beregomet Open Sport Festival.

Political career 
From 2010 to 2018, Zaremskyi was an independent deputy of the Berehomet local council, and was involved in issues including the local agricultural industry and the environment. From 2013 to 2015, he was Minister of Emergency Situations of Kitsman Raion, and he subsequently served as Head of the Department of Planning, Operational Duty, Communication and Notification within Chernivtsi Oblast's Department of Population Civil Protection.

In the 2019 Ukrainian parliamentary election, Zaremskyi was elected as a People's Deputy of Ukraine from Ukraine's 202nd electoral district. At the time of his election, he was an independent. He is a member of the Committee of the Verkhovna Rada on issues of budget.

References 

1991 births
Living people
Chernivtsi University alumni
Ninth convocation members of the Verkhovna Rada
Servant of the People (political party) politicians